The 2000 Nottingham Open was an Association of Tennis Professionals (ATP) tournament held in Nottingham, Great Britain. The tournament was held from 19 June to 26 June 2000. Fourth-seeded Sébastien Grosjean won his second title of the year and the 2nd of his career.

Finals

Singles

 Sébastien Grosjean defeated  Byron Black, 7–6(9–7), 6–3
 It was Grosjean's first singles title of his career.

Doubles

 Donald Johnson /  Piet Norval defeated  Ellis Ferreira /  Rick Leach, 1–6, 6–4, 6–3

References

External links
 ITF tournament edition details

 
Nottingham
Nottingham Open
Nottingham Open